ATP synthase mitochondrial F1 complex assembly factor 2 is an enzyme that in humans is encoded by the ATPAF2 gene.

This gene encodes an assembly factor for the F(1) component of the mitochondrial ATP synthase. This protein binds specifically to the F1 alpha subunit and is thought to prevent the subunit from forming nonproductive homooligomers during enzyme assembly. This gene is located within the Smith–Magenis syndrome region on chromosome 17. An alternatively spliced transcript variant has been described, but its biological validity has not been determined. A mutation in this gene has caused nuclear type 1 Complex V deficiency, characterized by lactic acidosis, encephalopathy, and developmental delays.

Structure 
The ATPAF2 gene is located on the p arm of chromosome 17 in position 11.2 and spans 24,110 base pairs. The gene produces a 32.8 kDa protein composed of 289 amino acids. This gene has at least 8 exons and is located within the Smith-Magenis syndrome region on chromosome 17.

Function 
The ATPAF2 gene encodes an essential housekeeping protein, an assembly factor for the F1 component of mitochondrial ATP synthase. This protein binds specifically to the F1 alpha subunit and is thought to prevent this subunit from forming nonproductive homooligomers during enzyme assembly.

Clinical significance 
In the only report of a mutation in the ATPAF2 gene, the resulting phenotype was nuclear type 1 Complex V deficiency inherited in an autosomal recessive manner. A homozygous 280T-A transversion caused a W94R amino acid substitution adjacent to a highly conserved glutamine. Symptoms included elevated blood, CSF, and urine lactate levels, developmental delays with failure to thrive and seizures, and a degenerative encephalopathy with cortical and subcortical atrophy.

Interactions 
The encoded protein interacts with ATP5F1A and FMC1, along with many other proteins.

Model organisms 
		
Model organisms have been used in the study of ATPAF2 function. A conditional knockout mouse line, called Atpaf2tm1a(KOMP)Wtsi was generated as part of the International Knockout Mouse Consortium program — a high-throughput mutagenesis project to generate and distribute animal models of disease to interested scientists.

Male and female animals underwent a standardized phenotypic screen to determine the effects of deletion. Twenty six tests were carried out on mutant mice and three significant abnormalities were observed. No homozygous mutant embryos were identified during gestation, and therefore none survived until weaning. The remaining tests were carried out on heterozygous mutant adult mice; males had abnormal vertebrae morphology.

References

Further reading

External links 
 

Genes mutated in mice